I Like It When You Sleep, for You Are So Beautiful yet So Unaware of It (stylised in sentence case) is the second studio album by English rock band the 1975, released on 26 February 2016 through Dirty Hit and Polydor. In 2014, frontman Matty Healy released a series of cryptic tweets containing lyrics from the album, revealing its title the following year. After their social accounts were deleted and reinstated with a new visual identity, the band officially confirmed the album in September 2015, a month before "Love Me" was released as the lead single. Over the course of five months, "Ugh!", "Somebody Else" and "The Sound" were released as singles, with "A Change of Heart" released four days prior to release. "She's American" and "Loving Someone" were later released in November 2016 and February 2017 as the final singles.

Upon its release, the album received positive reviews from critics. Several publications, including Pitchfork, Rolling Stone, and The Guardian, listed it as one of the best albums of 2016. It was also a commercial success, topping the charts in the United Kingdom and the United States, and its box set received a nomination for Best Boxed or Special Limited Edition Package at the 2017 Grammy Awards.

NME later placed the album sixth on their list of the Best Albums of The Decade. Additionally, Stereogum, Pitchfork, and Billboard placed it 61st, 161st, and 82nd, respectively.

Background
After the band released their self-titled debut, in 2013, they spent 2015 mostly recording a follow-up.

On 1 June, the band's Twitter accounts were deleted, which caused mass speculation from both fans and media alike that the band had broken up. On 2 June, Healy reactivated the accounts and tweeted again, but revealed a cryptic and symbolic comic strip containing the message that the band had gone on hiatus. A blurred Instagram picture from Healy titled "The 1975-2" set anticipation for release. The same day, the social media accounts were reinstated.

The tweet by Healy was verified as the name for their second album later in October 2015 with "Love Me" (a "very funky new single", according to Spin) released on 8 October.

Style
The band cited D'Angelo, Christina Aguilera, Jimmy Jam, Terry Lewis, Roberta Flack, My Bloody Valentine's Loveless, Boards of Canada, Kim Carnes, Scritti Politti, and Sigur Rós as inspirations for the record's 17 tracks.  The album's sound has been described as pop, new wave, dance-rock, indie rock, pop punk and soul. It also incorporates synth-pop, jazz, post-rock, dance-pop and R&B elements.

Promotion

Singles
On 8 October 2015, the 1975 released "Love Me" as a single from the album after announcement and was first played on BBC. On 10 December, they first played "Ugh!", the second single from the album, on Apple Music's Beats 1.

"The Sound" was premiered on Radio 1 on 14 January 2016, and was released as a radio single on 19 February. The music video premiered 6 days after. "Somebody Else" debuted on Beats 1 with Zane Lowe on 15 February, and released on iTunes and Spotify on 16 February. The music video debuted on 7 July. The next single, "A Change of Heart" debuted on BBC Radio 1 with Annie Mac on 22 February. A video for "She's American" was filmed but never released. "Loving Someone" was released as the seventh single.

Tour
A tour for the album began on 9 November 2015 in Liverpool. The band played the United Kingdom in November and the United States in December 2015, Asia and Oceania in January 2016, Europe in March to April 2016, and the US from April to May 2016. They played nine festivals over the summer of 2016, including Firefly Music Festival in June and the Reading and Leeds Festivals in August.

On 25 July 2016 the band announced a North American Tour for the Fall, beginning on 1 and 2 October at The Meadows Music & Arts Festival, and then playing three dates in Mexico, the first ever in the country. The band concluded the tour headlining Latitude Festival in Henham Park, United Kingdom on 14 July 2017, stating that it was "the end an of an era, but the start of a new era, called 'Music for Cars'". It is estimated that as of July 2017, the band had done over 150 concerts for this album-cycle.

Artwork 
The album's artwork and design was created by Samuel Burgess-Johnson and photographed by David Drake.

For each song on the album, a pink neon sign was created and put against various locations to create nostalgia for the song, but to also detail the thematic material and complexity of each song through the photo's atmosphere. Burgess-Johnson worked closely with Healy to help with the placement. The box set version of the album gained a nomination for the Grammy Award for Best Boxed or Special Limited Edition Package.

Release and reception 
The album was released on 26 February 2016. The US Target edition of the album includes two bonus tracks: a demo of "A Change of Heart" and the song "How to Draw".

The record received mostly positive reviews from music critics. At Metacritic, the album has an average score of 75 out of 100, which indicates "generally favorable reviews" based on 24 reviews. Writing for Exclaim!, Ian Gormely noted that the band's ambition was perhaps their sole stumbling block, though pursuing all musical avenues makes the result "overstuffed, awkwardly titled and frequently brilliant." In Drowned in Sounds review of the album, they praised the album's eclecticism and lyricism, concluding, "What they've made is a bold body of work that sounds effortless and odd and sophisticated. What they do next is likely to be stadium-filling and bonkers and brilliant, but it matters little when what they're doing now is so sensational."

NME, who had previously been highly critical of the band, also praised the album for its scope and ambition, writing, "Any record that burrows as deep into your psyche as 'I Like It...' should be considered essential. It's hugely clever and wryly funny, too." Although music journalist Alexis Petridis noted that parts of the album were over-ambitious, he went on to claim that "[i]ncredibly, though, most of the time Healy gets away with it. That's sometimes because his observations are sharp – as a skewering of celebrity #squad culture, "you look famous, let's be friends / And portray we possess something important / And do the things we like" is pretty acute – but more usually because they come loaded with witty self-awareness and deprecation: the endless depictions of vacuous, coke-numbed girls he has met would get wearying were it not for the fact that he keeps turning the lyrical crosshair on himself." In a more mixed review, Rolling Stone criticised tracks like 'Lostmyhead' and 'Please Be Naked' for being 'boring-melty' but praised songs such as 'Somebody Else', 'Loving Someone' and 'Love Me'.

Accolades

Commercial performance
The album became the group's second number one in the United Kingdom, debuting atop the UK Albums Chart, with combined sales of over 58,000. It became the group's first number one on the US Billboard 200, with 98,000 pure album sales in its debut week and 108,000 sps, while also setting the record for longest title of a Billboard number-one album with 71 characters. The next week, it fell to number 26, tying with Amos Lee's 2011 album Mission Bell for the fourth largest drop from number 1 as of January 2017. It also debuted at number one in Australia, New Zealand and Canada. The album was certified platinum by the British Phonographic Industry (BPI) for sales of over 300,000 copies in the United Kingdom. On 10 April 2017 the album was certified gold by the Recording Industry Association of America (RIAA) for combined sales and album-equivalent units of over 500,000 units.

Track listing

Personnel
Credits adapted from liner notes and Tidal.

The 1975
 George Daniel – programming , drums , keyboards , percussion ,  synthesiser , synthesiser programming , production 
 Adam Hann – electric guitar 
 Matthew Healy – vocals , background vocals , electric guitar , piano , keyboards , acoustic guitar , production 
 Ross MacDonald – bass guitar , upright bass 

Additional musicians

 Mike Crossey – programming 
 Jonathan Gilmore – programming 
 Jason McGee – conducting 
 Cassandra Grigsby-Chism – choir vocals 
 Nicole King-Morgan – choir vocals 
 Crystal Lewis – choir vocals 
 Crystal Butler – choir vocals 
 Sharetta Morgan-Harmon – choir vocals 
 Quishima Dixon – choir vocals 
 Carisa Moore – choir vocals 
 Fallynn Oliver – choir vocals 
 Edward Lawson – choir vocals 
 Marquee Perkins – choir vocals 
 James Connor – choir vocals 
 Vernon Burris – choir vocals 
 Derrick Evans – choir vocals 
 Anika Weibe – choir vocals 
 Monique Sullivan – choir vocals 
 John Waugh – saxophone 
 Roy Hargrove – flugelhorn 
 Miguel Atwood-Ferguson – violin, viola, cello, string arrangement 
 Jamie Squire – synthesiser 

Technical
 Mike Crossey – production, mixing
 Jonathan Gilmore – engineering, programming
 Chris Gehringer – mastering

Artwork
 Samuel Burgess-Johnson – art direction, design, photography
 David Drake – photography
 Edward Emberson – inlay photography

Charts

Weekly charts

Year-end charts

Certifications

References

2016 albums
The 1975 albums
Interscope Records albums
Polydor Records albums
Vagrant Records albums
Contemporary R&B albums by English artists
Dance-pop albums by English artists
Indie rock albums by English artists
New wave albums by English artists
Post-rock albums by English artists
Synth-pop albums by English artists
Dance-rock albums